The Crow Wing Historic County Courthouse, in Brainerd, Minnesota, United States, is a Beaux-Arts courthouse built in 1920.  The building, along with its adjoining jail, are listed on the National Register of Historic Places.

The Beaux-Arts style was popular in the first quarter of the 20th century for Minnesota courthouses.  The first floor has a rough-cut stone exterior, while the floors above are built of smooth-cut gray stone.  The interior has polished marble floors and walls, with a rotunda surrounded by a balcony.  The dome has both a colored glass skylight and a fine brass electrolier.

The Crow Wing Historical Society Museum is located in the former sheriff's residence and jail.

References

External links

 Crow Wing Historical Society - official site

Beaux-Arts architecture in Minnesota
Buildings and structures in Crow Wing County, Minnesota
County courthouses in Minnesota
County government buildings in Minnesota
Courthouses on the National Register of Historic Places in Minnesota
Defunct prisons in Minnesota
Jails on the National Register of Historic Places in Minnesota
Museums in Crow Wing County, Minnesota
National Register of Historic Places in Crow Wing County, Minnesota
Jails in Minnesota
1916 establishments in Minnesota